Gordon L. Goodwin (born 1954) is an American pianist, saxophonist, composer, arranger, and conductor. He is the leader of Gordon Goodwin's Big Phat Band. He has won four Grammy Awards and three Daytime Emmy Awards, and has received over twenty Grammy nominations for his compositions and arrangements.

Biography
Gordon Goodwin was born in Wichita, Kansas. He wrote his first big band chart, called "Hang Loose", when he was in the 7th grade. He continued his musical education at Cal State Northridge with Joel Leach and Bill Calkins. Following graduation from college, Goodwin was employed as a musician at the Disneyland theme park in Anaheim, California. Subsequently, Disney approached him to write a musical show featuring past and present Mouseketeers, including Britney Spears and Christina Aguilera. Since then, Goodwin has risen to prominence in the American studio music scene with his big band, The Big Phat Band. He has written and worked with artists like Ray Charles, Christina Aguilera, Johnny Mathis, John Williams, Natalie Cole, David Foster, Sarah Vaughan, Mel Torme, Leslie Odom Jr, Idina Menzel, Lang Lang, and Quincy Jones, to name a few. Goodwin is the host of a nationally syndicated jazz radio program called Phat Tracks with Gordon Goodwin, also airing weekends on KSDS, San Diego’s 88.3 FM.

Discography 
 Swingin' for the Fences (Immergent, 2001)
 XXL (Silverline, 2003)
 The Phat Pack (Silverline, 2006)
 Bah, Humduck! A Looney Tunes Christmas (Immergent, 2006)
 Act Your Age (Immergent, 2008)
 Dave Siebels With: Gordon Goodwin's Big Phat Band (PBGL, 2009)
 That's How We Roll (Telarc, 2011)
 Life in the Bubble (Telarc, 2014)
 A Big Phat Christmas (Music of Content, 2015)
The Gordian Knot (Music of Content, 2019)
The Gordian Knot (Dolby Atmos Release) (Music of Content, 2020)
The Reset  (Music of Content, 2021)

Source:

Awards and honors
Goodwin has received many individual awards, including a Grammy Award for Best Instrumental Arrangement for his work on the feature film The Incredibles.

Grammy Awards
 Best Instrumental Arrangement: "The Incredits" (2005), "Rhapsody in Blue" (2011), "On Green Dolphin Street" (2013)
 Best Large Jazz Ensemble Album: Life in the Bubble (2014)

Grammy Award nominations
 Best Large Jazz Ensemble Album: XXL (2003), Act Your Age (2008)
 Best Instrumental Composition: "Sing, Sang, Sung" (2000), "Hunting Wabbits" (2003), "Hit the Ground Running" (2008), "Hunting Wabbits 3 (Get Off My Lawn)" (2011), "California Pictures for String Quartet" (2013), "Life in the Bubble" (2014)
 Best Instrumental Arrangement: "Bach 2 Part Invention in D Minor" (2000), "Attack of the Killer Tomatoes" (2006), "Yo Tannenbaum" (2007), "Yesterdays" (2008), "Salt Peanuts! (Mani Salado)" (2012)
 Best Instrumental Arrangement Accompanying Vocalist(s): "Comes Love" (2003)
 Best Arrangement, Instrumental or A Cappella: "Get Smart" (2014)
 Best Arrangement, Instruments and Vocals: "Party Rockers" (2014), "Do You Hear What I Hear?" (2016)
 Best Arrangement, Instruments and Vocals: "I Loves You Porgy" / "There's A Boat That's Leavin' Soon For New York" (2017)

Source:

Daytime Emmy Awards
 Music Direction and Composition, Animaniacs (1998, 1999)
 Outstanding Music Direction and Composition, Histeria! (2000)

Memberships
 Goodwin was initiated into the men's music fraternity, Phi Mu Alpha Sinfonia, as a National Honorary member and was made a Signature Sinfonian at the 55th National Convention in New Orleans, Louisiana, 2015.

See also
 List of jazz arrangers

References

Further reading
Down Beat article

1954 births
American conductors (music)
American male conductors (music)
American jazz pianists
American male pianists
American jazz composers
American music arrangers
Animation composers
Big band bandleaders
California State University, Northridge alumni
Grammy Award winners
Living people
20th-century American pianists
21st-century American pianists
American male jazz composers
20th-century American male musicians
21st-century American male musicians
Gordon Goodwin's Big Phat Band members